Rock Creek-White Run Union Hospital Complex is a national historic district located at Cumberland Township, Gettysburg, and Mount Joy Township in Adams County, Pennsylvania. The district includes 11 contributing buildings and 13 contributing sites, on 13 contiguous properties including 8 farmsteads and White's Church (or Marks German Reformed Church). The farmsteads are Schwartz Farm, Shaeffer Farm, Trostle Farm, Lewis Bushman Farm, Diener Farm, Conover Farm, Lightner Farm, and Beitler Farm. The properties served as hospitals for the 1st, 2nd, 3rd, 5th, 6th, and 12th corps of the Army of the Potomac during the weeks immediately following the Battle of Gettysburg.

It was listed on the National Register of Historic Places in 2000.

References 

American Civil War hospitals
Historic districts on the National Register of Historic Places in Pennsylvania
Buildings and structures in Adams County, Pennsylvania
Pennsylvania in the American Civil War
National Register of Historic Places in Adams County, Pennsylvania